Achchamundu! Achchamundu! ( There is fear! There is fear!) is a 2009 Indian-American Tamil language social thriller directed by Arun Vaidyanathan, starring Prasanna, Emmy Award–winning American actor John Shea and Sneha. It is the first film in Indian cinema to be shot with the Red One camera system. The music was composed by Karthik Raja with cinematography by Chris Freilich. The film was released on 17 July 2009 worldwide.

Plot
Senthil Kumar (Prasanna) and Malini (Sneha) are a happily married couple in New Jersey, living life like any other born-in-India, arrived-in-the-US couple do. Senthil submerges himself in the office and eats sambar rice at home, and Malini never misses a bhajan at the temple and shops at Indian stores. They have a 10-year-old daughter Rithika (Akshaya Dinesh), the apple of their eyes (their car's license plate carries the name of their daughter).

The family has just settled down in a new, spacious home about which Malini, understandably, has fears. The couple squabbles amicably about everything from Malini's perpetual laundry and cooking; while Senthil argues with friends about the significance of viboothi and takes his family on weekend trips and birthday parties. It is a normal, happy life in the US until Robertson (John Shea) arrives, to paint the basement. Now, things are never the same at home again.

Robertson's unusually kind behavior towards children sets off warning bells in your head, especially when he is shown to be a pedophile who exercises like mad within the confines of his home, always moving on towards his next target. How the couple saves their child forms the rest of the story.

Cast
 Prasanna as Senthil Kumar
 John Shea as Robertson
 Sneha as Malini 
 Akshaya Dinesh as Rithika

Production

Title
The film's title is the inverse of the phrase "Achamillai Achamillai" coined by poet Subramania Bharati, and later used as the title of a 1984 film directed by K. Balachander.

Filming
The film was made in 28 days on a budget of ₹3.25 crore (worth ₹11 crore in 2021 prices). For the first time in Indian cinema, Red One camera was used for filming. The film was shot in New Jersey and New York during early 2008. Color correction and sound mixing were done in Los Angeles.

Release
The movie was released on 17 July 2009 in Tamil Nadu and select markets in the United States.

Reception
The film was officially selected for screening at the 12th Shanghai International Film Festival (under the International Panorama category), the Digital Cinema Film Festival in Japan, the Cairo International Film Festival, the International Film Festival of India in Goa, and the Chennai International Film Festival.

Soundtrack
The soundtrack was composed by Karthik Raja.

Reception
Rediff wrote "For the guts in coming up with a unique, important theme that needs to be addressed sensitively, this movie works. A must-watch". Behindwoods wrote "Although the theme of child abuse is a serious issue and has the potency to take on a different shade with even the slightest skew, Arun Vaidhyanathan has done a tightrope walking commendably with absolutely no shades of vulgarity or impropriety. Kudos for tackling such a sensitive subject with a lot of sensibility and acumen!". The Times of India wrote "The average Indian may shy away from paedophilia, but director Vaidyanathan makes a compelling case to watch this film. Subtlety is the byword here rather than gory, knife-edge moments. The approach makes a deeper impression than a dramatic one could have." A critic from Deccan Herald opined that "Despite its shortcomings, ‘Achamundu Achamundu’ deserves a dekko".

Awards and nominations

References

External links
 Official Website
 Director's Blog
 
 Chennai International Film Festival.
 The Seoul Times review

Indian thriller films
American thriller films
Films set in New Jersey
Films shot in New Jersey
Films about women in the Indian diaspora
2009 films
Films scored by Karthik Raja
Films about child abuse
2000s Tamil-language films
2009 directorial debut films
Films directed by Arun Vaidyanathan
2000s American films